The women's long jump event  at the 1989 IAAF World Indoor Championships was held at the Budapest Sportcsarnok in Budapest on 4 March.

Results

References

Long jump
Long jump at the World Athletics Indoor Championships